Pernovo ( or ) is a settlement in the Municipality of Žalec in east-central Slovenia. It lies in the southwestern part of the Hudinja Hills. The area is part of the traditional region of Styria. The municipality is now included in the Savinja Statistical Region.

The local church is dedicated to Saint Oswald and belongs to the Parish of Galicija. It is originally a medieval building with major 17th- and 19th-century rebuilding phases.

References

External links
Pernovo at Geopedia

Populated places in the Municipality of Žalec